Ivlev is a Russian masculine surname, its feminine counterpart is Ivleva. It may refer to
Alexandru Ivlev (born 1981), Moldovan swimmer
Leonid Ivlev (born 1972), Russian politician
Pavel Ivlev (born 1970), Russian lawyer
Sergey Ivlev (born 1983), Russian badminton player 

Russian-language surnames